Tsoi Ngai Won (born June 12, 1960) is a Hong Kong sprint canoer who competed in the mid 1980s. He was eliminated in the repechages of both the K-1 1000 m and the K-2 500 m events at the 1984 Summer Olympics in Los Angeles.

External links
Sports-Reference.com profile

1960 births
Canoeists at the 1984 Summer Olympics
Hong Kong male canoeists
Living people
Olympic canoeists of Hong Kong